Carl-Ehrenfried Carlberg (24 February 1889 – 22 January 1962) was a Swedish gymnast who competed in the 1912 Summer Olympics.

Early life and Olympics
Carlberg was born in Stockholm and served in the Royal Guards Regiment Göta of the Swedish army, whilst also training to be an engineer. A keen sportsman during his army service he was part of the Swedish team, which won the gold medal in the gymnastics men's team, Swedish system event. Following this triumph he founded a gymnastics institute at Lillsved, whilst also building a successful career in construction.

Politics
In his post-gymnastic career Carlberg formed his own Gymniska Förbundet in 1928. Publishing the magazine Gymn, the society underlined what it saw as the decadence of Western society, drawing heavily from Elof Eriksson. This group fizzled out by 1932 although Carlberg was a founder and the main financial supporter of the anti-Semitic Manhem Association, a study group which he helped set up in 1934. The group's membership was cross party, involving members of the Nationalsocialistiska Arbetarpartiet, Per Engdahl's Riksförbundet Det nya Sverige and the Riksförbundet Sverige-Tyskland, amongst others.

A strong supporter of Nazism, he recruited men for both military and civilian service for the Third Reich during World War II. By this time he had become a very rich man due to his business interests and used his money to disseminate Nazi propaganda and to fund the Svensk Opposition of Per Engdahl.

Following the war his Hjälpkommittén för Tysklands barn worked as a relief organisation for German officers, whilst his Svea Rike publishing house, originally set up in the 1930s, was turned over to Neo-Nazism. He also became the largest shareholder in Nation Europa, and set up a Carlberg Foundation aimed at youth.

After his death in Stockholm he left his apartment to the Foundation and in 1965 it was raided by police due to a tip-off that the groups using it had stashed weapons there.

Bibliography
Philip Rees, Biographical Dictionary of the Extreme Right Since 1890, p. 54

References

External links
profile

1889 births
1962 deaths
Sportspeople from Stockholm
Swedish male artistic gymnasts
Gymnasts at the 1912 Summer Olympics
Olympic gymnasts of Sweden
Olympic gold medalists for Sweden
Swedish collaborators with Nazi Germany
Swedish Nazis
Olympic medalists in gymnastics
Medalists at the 1912 Summer Olympics
20th-century Swedish people